Derek Alfred Aucoin (27 March 1970 – 26 December 2020) was a Major League Baseball pitcher. Aucoin pitched in two games for the Montreal Expos in the 1996 season. He had a 0–1 record, in 2.2 innings, with a 3.38 ERA. He died from brain cancer on 26 December 2020.

He was signed by the Expos as an amateur free agent in 1989.

Professional baseball career

Montreal Expos
In his first professional season, with the Gulf Coast League Expos he went 2–1 with a 2.66 ERA in seven games, three starts.

While with the Short-Season Jamestown Expos in  Aucoin compiled a record of 1–3 with a 4.46 ERA in eight games, all starts.

In 1991 he went 3–6 with a 4.28 ERA in 41 games, four starts with the Sumter Flyers. In 1992 he went 3–2 with a 3.00 ERA in 39 games, two starts with the Rockford Expos.

He compiled a record of 4–4 with a 4.24 ERA in 38 games, six starts.

In  Aucoin split the season between West Palm Beach and the Double-A Harrisburg Senators of the Eastern League He went a combined 3–4 with a 2.82 ERA in 38 games. Staying at Harrisburg in  he went 2–4 with a 4.96 ERA in 29 games.

Aucoin split the  season between the Expos and the Triple-A Ottawa Lynx of the International League. With Ottawa he went 3–5 with a 3.96 ERA in 52 games. On 21 May  he made his Major League debut against the San Francisco Giants. In  of an inning he gave up one earned run and registering a loss. He would finish his Major Career going 0–1 with a 3.39 ERA in two games.

With West Palm Beach and Ottawa in  he went a combined 0–1 with a dismal 11.37 ERA in 25 games.

New York Mets
In his final season, Aucoin split the season between the Gulf Coast League Mets, the Advanced-A St. Lucie Mets, the Double-A Binghamton Mets and the Triple-A Norfolk Tides. He went a combined 1–0 with a 6.21 ERA in 28 games.

Personal life
In April 2011, Derek married Isabelle Rochefort. They had a son, Dawson Paul Aucoin, named after Hall of Fame player Andre Dawson.

References

External links

1970 births
2020 deaths
French Quebecers
Canadian expatriate baseball players in the United States
Major League Baseball pitchers
Major League Baseball players from Canada
Jamestown Expos players
Montreal Expos players
Sumter Flyers players
Rockford Expos players
West Palm Beach Expos players
Harrisburg Senators players
Ottawa Lynx players
St. Lucie Mets players
Binghamton Mets players
Norfolk Tides players
Baseball people from Quebec
People from Lachine, Quebec
Baseball players from Montreal
Deaths from brain cancer in Canada